Andrzej Sykta (born 9 September 1940) is a Polish footballer. He played in two matches for the Poland national football team from 1959 to 1962.

References

External links
 

1940 births
Living people
Polish footballers
Poland international footballers
Place of birth missing (living people)
Association footballers not categorized by position